Tommi Vaiho (born 13 September 1988) is a Swedish footballer who plays for Djurgårdens IF as a goalkeeper.

Career
Vaiho began his career with IF Brommapojkarna and moved in 2003 to Djurgårdens IF.

He joined the club from the junior squad at the start of the 2005 season, but is still to make his Allsvenskan debut for DIF, he played only three Svenska Cupen games. He was later loaned out in the season 2007 to Värtans IK and in 2008 played eleven games for IK Frej in the Division 2 Norra Svealand. Vaiho left on loan to Vasalunds IF in January 2009. He returned to Djurgården after the season. Vaiho made his Allsvenskan debut on 14 March 2010, against BK Häcken.

On 8 December 2016 Vaiho signed a 3-year deal with Djurgårdens IF.

On 10 February 2022, Vaiho joined Sirius on loan until mid-July 2022.

Honours
Djurgårdens IF
Allsvenskan: 2019
 Svenska Cupen: 2017–18
Individual
 Årets Järnkamin: 2019

References

External links
 Profile at Djurgården website
 
 Profile at Eliteprospects

1988 births
Living people
Swedish people of Finnish descent
Swedish footballers
Sweden youth international footballers
Footballers from Stockholm
Association football goalkeepers
Allsvenskan players
Division 2 (Swedish football) players
Djurgårdens IF Fotboll players
Värtans IK players
Vasalunds IF players
GAIS players
IK Sirius Fotboll players